Marjorie Kitchel Korringa (née Whallon; 8 August 1943 - 8 September 1974) was an igneous petrologist, volcanologist, and structural geologist. She is chiefly known for her research on active fault systems as a critical part of decision-making for the location of oil pipelines and nuclear reactors.

Early life and education 
Korringa was born on August 8, 1943 in Richmond, Indiana to Robert Edward and Dorothy (Curme) Whallon. She graduated in 1960 from high school in Averill Park, New York. Graduating cum laude, she obtained a Bachelor of Arts in geology from Radcliffe College in Cambridge, Massachusetts in 1964. Later, she worked in the geology department at Harvard University as a laboratory analyst, learning the key tools necessary for petrologic research. In 1972, Korringa received her PhD in geology from Stanford University. Her dissertation focused on the volcanic occurrences involved in the linear vent region of an ash-flow sheet in Nevada called Soldier Meadow Tuff.

Career and research 
She began her career at the University of Nevada as a geological consultant to Professor David B. Slemmons, who conducted research in earthquake geology and engineering. Slemmons and Korringa discovered two large ash-flow sheets in the Eureka Valley Tuff near Bridgeport, California, along with a smaller overlying unit of ash-flow tuff. This finding confirmed the suggested correlation of the volcanic rock quartz latite in this area.

At the University of Nevada, she also worked with Donald C. Noble regarding volcanic petrology in North America and Peru. This is where her interest in active faults and landslides started. In 1970, Noble, Korringa, and other colleagues evaluated mafic, andesitic, and silicic lavas, and ash-flow and air-fall tuff in northwestern Nevada. Through potassium-argon dating, they found that the majority of the volcanic eruptions had occurred between 14.5 and 16 million years ago. They also determined the oldest ash-flow unit in the area to be about 24 million years old. By finding these ages, they were able to establish that the volcanism took place in the Miocene Epoch. In Mono County, California, they evaluated strontium and lead isotopic data, finding that the obsidian from Glass Mountain was the result of fractional crystallization. Noble and Korringa continued their research by studying calcium variations in whole-rock and glass samples from Quaternary lavas in Crater Lake, Oregon. 

Korringa joined Woodward-Clyde Consultants, a civil, geotechnical and environmental engineering and construction firm, where she researched active faulting. In the Alyeska fault study for the Trans-Alaska Pipeline System, she was the central, leading participant. She co-authored numerous reports for the company, her most noteworthy being the Alyeska fault study's "Basis for Pipeline Design for Active-Fault Crossings for the Trans-Alaska Pipeline." In the two years that Marjorie worked with Woodward-Clyde Consultants, she became chairman of the Geology-Seismology-Geophysics Planning Committee. She was headed for significant managerial responsibility, as she "influenced almost every phase of their geologic practice." She was also part of the Auditing Committee of the Seismological Society of America.

By the time of her death in 1974, she had a principal role in designing the extent of evaluation, along with the photo geological interpretation of imagery, for three projects at Woodward-Clyde: the study of a nuclear-reactor project in California, a nuclear-reactor siting in Italy, and the Managua earthquake and its faults for the Nicaraguan government.

Personal life 
Korringa was fond of the outdoors and often enjoyed backpacking, hiking, and camping. She was a member of the environmental organization the Sierra Club and attempted to preserve numerous natural areas. She was especially active in the Sierra Club's efforts to establish a Redwood National Park. At a hearing in 1986 in Crescent City, California, she advocated for the establishment of the park. She encouraged the committee to increase the maximum acreage for the park, and spoke of the ecological, economic, and recreational benefits of its formation for future generations. She stressed that if the committee did not act soon to protect the land, a significant amount of it would quickly be logged and destroyed. After the lobbying of Congress, the bill creating Redwood National Park, now called Redwood National and State Parks, was signed on October 2, 1968 by President Lyndon Johnson.

Korringa was married twice, and was single at the time of her death.

Death 
On September 8, 1974, Korringa was aboard TWA Flight 841 that crashed between Athens and Rome, into the Ionian Sea. The detonation of a hidden bomb on board brought the plane down about half an hour after leaving Athens, as determined by the National Transportation Safety Board. She had presented a paper on active faults at the International Symposium on Recent Crustal Movements in Zurich a few days prior. She had paid a brief visit to her parents, who lived on Crete, before taking the TWA flight for Rome, where she was to take part in a nuclear-reactor siting study for the Italian government. Her body was never recovered.

Legacy 
A year after Korringa's death, The Marjorie K. Korringa Scholarship Fund was established at Stanford University. The scholarship's purpose was to promote further geologic learning and interest in her most prominent fields of research, namely volcanic petrology and active fault systems. The funding allowed the next generation of women going into both undergraduate and graduate geology programs to extend and build upon Korringa's initial studies.

Along with Korringa's applied geologic efforts that enhanced Woodward-Clyde's productivity and economic results, her extensive philosophical and theoretical evaluations, in the form of laboratory and field studies, contributed to the growth of academic geology.

Selected publications 
Publications as selected in Korringa's memorial.

See also 

 Women in geology

References 

Women geologists
Redwood National and State Parks
Petrologists
Volcanologists
1943 births
1974 deaths
People from Richmond, Indiana
Radcliffe College alumni
Stanford University alumni
American geologists